The Men's 200 metre breaststroke competition of the swimming events at the 2015 World Aquatics Championships was held on 6 August with the heats and the semifinals and 7 August with the final.

Records
Prior to the competition, the existing world and championship records were as follows.

Results

Heats
The heats were held at 10:33.

Semifinals
The semifinals were held at 18:29.

Semifinal 1

Semifinal 2

Final
The final was held at 18:55.

References

Men's 200 metre breaststroke